Poulton Wood is a   Local Nature Reserve in Aldington, south-east of Ashford in Kent. It is owned and managed by Canterbury Oast Trust.

This is a woodland of coppiced oak, hornbeam and ash, and spring flowers include bluebells. It is managed as a conservation project providing training in subjects such as coppice management and woodcrafts.

There is access from Forge Hill.

References

Local Nature Reserves in Kent